The Barbados–France Maritime Delimitation Agreement is a 2009 treaty between Barbados and France which delimits the maritime boundary between Barbados and the French Overseas departments of Guadeloupe and Martinique.  The far western point under this agreement consists of the border at a tripoint with Saint Lucia as under the France–Saint Lucia Delimitation Agreement and proceeds in a northeast direction.

See also 
 Martinique Passage
 Dominica–France Maritime Delimitation Agreement
 Saint Lucia Channel

Notes
Notice of preliminary discussions
Signature Of The Barbados/France Maritime Boundary Delimitation Treaty
Statement by Senator the Hon. Maxine McClean, Minister of Foreign Affairs and Foreign Trade, on the Occasion of the Signature of the Barbados/France Maritime Boundary Delimitation Treaty Bridgetown - October 15, 2009
Treaty details in English
Treaty details in French
DELIMITATION OF MARITIME BOUNDARIES WITHIN CARICOM

External links
Full text of agreement
  ORF no. 0016 du 20 janvier 2010 page 1176 texte no. 6, The French Official Gazette
  Official Gazette No. 0016 of January 20, 2010 1176 page Text # 6, The French Official Gazette

Treaties concluded in 2009
Treaties entered into force in 2010
2009 in Barbados
2009 in the Caribbean
2009 in France
Barbados–Guadeloupe border
Barbados–Martinique border
Treaties of Barbados
Boundary treaties
Bilateral treaties of France